Vishenki may refer to:

 Vishenki, Chernihiv Oblast, a village in Ukraine

Vishenki is also the name of several settlements in Russia:
Vishenki, Starodubsky District, Bryansk Oblast, a village in Zapolskokhaleyevichsky Selsoviet of Starodubsky District of Bryansk Oblast
Vishenki, Zlynkovsky District, Bryansk Oblast, a settlement in Karpilovsky Selsoviet of Zlynkovsky District of Bryansk Oblast
Vishenki, Kaluga Oblast, a village in Babyninsky District of Kaluga Oblast
Vishenki, Lipetsk Oblast, a village in Troitsky Selsoviet of Lev-Tolstovsky District of Lipetsk Oblast
Vishenki, Mozhaysky District, Moscow Oblast, a village in Zamoshinskoye Rural Settlement of Mozhaysky District of Moscow Oblast
Vishenki, Ruzsky District, Moscow Oblast, a village in Kolyubakinskoye Rural Settlement of Ruzsky District of Moscow Oblast
Vishenki, Shakhovskoy District, Moscow Oblast, a village in Stepankovskoye Rural Settlement of Shakhovskoy District of Moscow Oblast
Vishenki, Volokolamsky District, Moscow Oblast, a village in Spasskoye Rural Settlement of Volokolamsky District of Moscow Oblast
Vishenki, Buturlinsky District, Nizhny Novgorod Oblast, a settlement in Bolshebakaldsky Selsoviet of Buturlinsky District of Nizhny Novgorod Oblast
Vishenki, Sechenovsky District, Nizhny Novgorod Oblast, a village in Krasnovsky Selsoviet of Sechenovsky District of Nizhny Novgorod Oblast
Vishenki, Vachsky District, Nizhny Novgorod Oblast, a village in Novoselsky Selsoviet of Vachsky District of Nizhny Novgorod Oblast
Vishenki, Smolensk Oblast, a village in Prechistenskoye Rural Settlement of Dukhovshchinsky District of Smolensk Oblast
Vishenki, Tula Oblast, a village in Malakhovsky Rural Okrug of Zaoksky District of Tula Oblast
Vishenki, Kalininsky District, Tver Oblast, a village in Burashevskoye Rural Settlement of Kalininsky District of Tver Oblast
Vishenki, Torzhoksky District, Tver Oblast, a village in Strashevichskoye Rural Settlement of Torzhoksky District of Tver Oblast
Vishenki, Vladimir Oblast, a selo in Suzdalsky District of Vladimir Oblast